Michael J. McCaffrey (born December 18, 1963) is an American politician and a Democratic member of the Rhode Island Senate representing District 29 since January 2003. He has been the Rhode Island Senate Majority Leader since March 23, 2017. McCaffrey served consecutively from January 1995 until January 2003 in the District 16 seat.

Early life and education
McCaffrey was born December 18, 1963 in Providence, Rhode Island. He earned his BS in accounting from Providence College and his JD from Suffolk University Law School.

Political career
When District 16 incumbent Senator Joseph McGair left the Legislature and left the seat open, McCaffrey won the September 13, 1994 Democratic Primary and won the November 8, 1994 General election with 4,923 votes (57.6%) against Republican nominee Thomas Stone. McCaffrey was unopposed for the September 10, 1996 Democratic Primary, winning with 1,564 votes, and won the November 5, 1996 General election with 6,411 votes (78.8%) against Republican nominee Ernest Young.

McCaffrey was unopposed for both the September 15, 1998 Democratic Primary, winning with 1,087 votes, and the November 3, 1998 General election, winning with 5,711 votes. Two years later, McCaffrey was unopposed for the September 12, 2000 Democratic Primary, winning with 1,786 votes, and won the November 7, 2000 General election with 6,476 votes (76.5%) against Republican nominee Saleh Shahid.

Redistricted to District 29, McCaffrey was unopposed for both the September 10, 2002 Democratic Primary, winning with 2,025 votes, and the November 5, 2002 General election, winning with 8,100 votes. McCaffrey was unopposed for both the September 14, 2004 Democratic Primary, winning with 609 votes, and the November 2, 2004 General election, winning with 9,141 votes.

McCaffrey was unopposed for both the September 12, 2006 Democratic Primary, winning with 1,760 votes, and the November 7, 2006 General election, winning with 9,383 votes. He was also unopposed for both the September 9, 2008 Democratic Primary, winning with 939 votes, and the November 4, 2008 General election, winning with 9,740 votes. McCaffrey was unopposed for both the September 23, 2010 Democratic Primary, winning with 1,652 votes, and the November 2, 2010 General election, winning with 7,600 votes. He was challenged in the September 11, 2012 Democratic Primary, winning with 1,831 votes (53.3%), and was unopposed for the November 6, 2012 General election, winning with 10,149 votes.

References

External links
Official page at the Rhode Island General Assembly

Michael McCaffrey at Ballotpedia
Michael J. McCaffrey at the National Institute on Money in State Politics

1963 births
21st-century American politicians
Bishop Hendricken High School alumni
Democratic Party Rhode Island state senators
Living people
Politicians from Providence, Rhode Island
Politicians from Warwick, Rhode Island
Providence College alumni
Rhode Island lawyers
Suffolk University Law School alumni